A Lie group integrator is a numerical integration method for differential equations built from coordinate-independent operations such as Lie group actions on a manifold. They have been used for the animation and control of vehicles in computer graphics and control systems/artificial intelligence research. 
These tasks are particularly difficult because they feature nonholonomic constraints.

See also

 Euler integration
 Lie group
 Numerical methods for ordinary differential equations
 Parallel parking problem
 Runge–Kutta methods
 Variational integrator

References

Numerical analysis